Crowhaven Farm is a 1970 American made-for-television supernatural horror film directed by Walter Grauman and starring Hope Lange, Paul Burke and John Carradine. It originally aired as the ABC Movie of the Week on November 24, 1970.

Plot
A young couple, Maggie and Ben, inherit an old New England farm. Soon after moving in, Maggie starts having terrifying visions that seem to point to a ghastly past involving witches and Satanic cults. Soon, the sinister past has evil designs for the new couple.

Cast
Hope Lange as Maggie Porter
Paul Burke as Ben Porter
Lloyd Bochner as Kevin Pierce
John Carradine as Nate Cheever
Cindy Eilbacher as Jennifer
Cyril Delevanti as Harold Dane
Milton Selzer as Dr. Terminer
Patricia Barry as Felicia

Production
The film was announced in August 1970.

Reception

Critical
The Los Angeles Times called it "spooky, diverting".

Terror Trap gave the film 4 out of 4 stars, calling it "[an] Exceptional TV horror", and praised the film's performances, plot, and atmosphere. Maitland McDonagh from TV Guide gave the film 3/5 stars, commending the film's "creepy atmosphere and dark twist ending", while noting that the film had fewer shocks than its contemporaries. Craig Butler from Allmovie praised the film, calling it "One of the best of the made-for-TV "horror" films that proliferated in the early 1970s".

Ratings
The film was the fifth highest rating show on US television on the week it aired, following Swing Out, Sweet Land, Marcus Welby, M.D., a special of Oklahoma!, and Here's Lucy.

References

External links
 
 
 
 
Crowhaven Farm at Letterbox DVD
Complete film at Internet Archive

1970 television films
1970 films
1970 horror films
1970s supernatural films
ABC Movie of the Week
American supernatural horror films
American horror television films
Films about cults
Films about Satanism
Films about witchcraft
Films directed by Walter Grauman
Films produced by Aaron Spelling
1970s supernatural horror films
1970s English-language films
1970s American films